Mothers and Daughters is a 2008 Canadian comedy-drama film, directed by Carl Bessai.

The film, an exploration of mother-daughter relationships, centres on a group of women in Vancouver. Micki (Babz Chula) is a romance novelist who has tried to relate to her daughter Rebecca (Camille Sullivan) as a friend and peer rather than as a mother; Brenda (Gabrielle Rose) is a woman whose relationship with her daughter Kate (Tiffany Lyndall-Knight) is tested when her husband leaves her for another woman; Celine (Tantoo Cardinal) is a single house painter with no children, who has the opportunity to indulge her maternal instincts when her young client Cynthia (Tinsel Korey) needs assistance with her pregnancy. The characters and dialogue were developed by the actresses through an improvisational process.

At the 2008 Vancouver International Film Festival, the film won the audience award for Most Popular Canadian Film. Rose received a Genie Award nomination for Best Actress at the 30th Genie Awards.

Bessai went on to make two more films, Fathers & Sons (2010) and Sisters & Brothers (2011), that used a similar process and structure to explore family dynamics.

References

External links
 
 

2008 films
2008 comedy-drama films
Canadian comedy-drama films
English-language Canadian films
Films shot in Vancouver
Films set in Vancouver
Films directed by Carl Bessai
2000s English-language films
2000s Canadian films